Notiokasis is a genus of ground beetles in the family Carabidae. This genus has a single species, Notiokasis chaudoiri.

References

Nebriinae
Monotypic Carabidae genera